The Buffalo mayoral election of 1981 took place in Buffalo, New York, USA, on November 4, 1981, and resulted in the incumbent mayor Jimmy Griffin winning a second term over his opponent, the local politician Alfred Coppola, who ran on a minor party line.

References

Buffalo
1981
Buffalo